Peter Brent Littlewood (born 18 May 1955) is a British physicist and Professor of Physics at the University of Chicago. He was the 12th Director of Argonne National Laboratory. He previously headed the Cavendish Laboratory as well as the Theory of Condensed Matter group and the Theoretical Physics Research department at Bell Laboratories. Littlewood serves as the founding chair of the board of trustees of the Faraday Institution.

Career
He gained a first-class degree in Natural Sciences at the University of Cambridge in 1976, and was then awarded a Kennedy Scholarship to work at the Massachusetts Institute of Technology for two years. He returned to Cambridge in 1977 to complete his PhD.

Beginning in 1980, he worked at Bell Labs, finishing his time there as head of the theoretical physics research after assuming the position in 1992. He continued to be a member of technical staff until 2001.

In 1997, he became a professor at the Cavendish Laboratory in Cambridge, and was head of the Theory of Condensed Matter group, and served as Matthias Scholar at Los Alamos National Laboratory during a 2003-04 sabbatical. In 2005, he returned to Cambridge to become head of the Cavendish Laboratory, before being named in 2011 the Associate Laboratory Director for Physical Sciences and Engineering at the Argonne National Laboratory.  On March 25, 2014, Littlewood was named to the director's post.  In January 2017, he retired as director to resume his research at the University of Chicago. Since 2022, he also holds a partial appointment at the School of Physics and Astronomy, University of St Andrews of the University of St Andrews in Scotland, UK.

Littlewood holds six patents, has published more than 200 articles in scientific journals and has given more than 200 invited talks at international conferences, universities and laboratories.

Honours and positions
From his curriculum vitae, 2010.
 Fellow, Royal Society of London, 2007
 Fellow, Institute of Physics, 2005
 Matthias Scholar, Los Alamos National Laboratory, 2003-2004
 Consultant, Los Alamos National Laboratory, 2004-
 Consultant, National High Magnetic Field Laboratory, 2004-
 Fellow, Trinity College Cambridge, 1997
 Fellow, American Physical Society, 1989
 Distinguished Member of Technical Staff, AT&T Bell Laboratories, 1989
 Professeur Associé and visiting scientist, CNRS, Grenoble, 1986
 Denman Baynes Student, Clare College, Cambridge 1979-80
 Kennedy Scholar, Massachusetts Institute of Technology, 1976–77
 Senior Scholar, Trinity College Cambridge, 1974–76

Work
Littlewood's research has variously included studying the phenomenology and microscopic theory of high-temperature superconductors, transition metal oxides and other correlated electronic systems, and the optical properties of highly excited semiconductors. He has applied his methods to engineering, including holographic storage, optical fibers and devices, and new materials for particle detectors.

References

Fellows of the Royal Society
Fellows of Trinity College, Cambridge
British physicists
Living people
1955 births
Theoretical physicists
University of Chicago faculty
Scientists at Bell Labs
Santa Fe Institute people
Argonne National Laboratory people
Fellows of the American Physical Society
Fellows of the Institute of Physics
Scientists of the Cavendish Laboratory
Massachusetts Institute of Technology alumni
Kennedy Scholarships